The Diamer District, also spelled Diamir District,) is a district in Gilgit-Baltistan territory of Pakistan. The headquarters of the district is the town of Chilas. The district is bounded by on the north by the Tangir and the Gilgit districts, on the east by the Astore District, on the south by the Mansehra district of Pakistan's Khyber Pakhtunkhwa Province and the Neelum District of Azad Kashmir, and on the west by the Upper Kohistan District of Khyber Pakhtunkhwa Province. The Karakoram Highway passes through the Diamer District.

History

Ancient India 
Thalpas, located opposite to the Chilas town, bears the most abundant collection of rock-art in Pakistan — the Pakistan-German Archaeological Mission has published about them in six dedicated volumes and traced them to Greco-Buddhist antiquity. Buddhist Stupas and anthropomorphic Buddhas remain the most common subject of rock-carvings in and around Chilas.

Karl Jettmar suggests that Chilas might have had been a Buddhist sanctuary while Harald Hauptmann hypothesizes Thalpas to be the "Talilo" of Chinese sources; however, in absence of excavations, such claims remain in the realm of speculations.

British India 
During the British Raj, the area was known as Chilas and regarded as a tribal area, subsidiary to the princely state of Jammu and Kashmir. Its original name was apparently .

The region was brought under the control of the Maharaja of Jammu and Kashmir in 1851, and an agent of the Kashmir durbar was stationed there. In 1893, Chilas was taken over by the British-run Gilgit Agency. An Assistant Political Agent of the Agency was stationed in the Chilas town. The Raja was soon deposed and Chilas functioned a 'republican community' under the aegis of jirga, a body of local landowning men.

Pakistan 
Prior to 2019, the Darel District and the Tangir District were part of the Diamer District but were subsequently elevated to district status. The jirga continues to play a significant role in governance.

Demographics 
The district is the only Sunni-majority district in Gilgit-Baltistan.

Transportation 
Before the Karakoram Highway was opened in 1978, the only road from the south to the town of Gilgit was a rough track north from Balakot to the Babusar Pass (via Kaghan, Naran, Besal, and Gittidas) and further north from Babusar Gah to Chilas. The road up to Besal is better than it was previously, and the road from Besal to the Babusar Pass is good, having been recently metaled.

See also

Districts of Gilgit–Baltistan

Notes

References

Bibliography
 

Diamer District